Eladio Manligues Jala (born February 18, 1949) is a Philippine lawyer and politician.

Biography 

It is a long way from rural Loboc in Bohol to the congressional halls in Batasan Hills in Quezon City. Starting out a teacher, Jala as a lawyer- lawmaker, representing the 3rd district of Bohol in the Lower House for three consecutive terms.

Jala was born in Loboc to Olegario Jala and Gregoria Manligues and begun his studies at the town's Central Elementary school. He was later sent to the Divine Word College (DWC), now Holy Name University, in Tagbilaran City for his secondary and tertiary education, finishing a Political Science course and predictably, going on to law school. Among the many Bar examinees coming from the DWC School of Law, Eladio came out to be the only one who passed the rigid exams in 1982, an achievement of note attesting to a triumph no one can refute.

Between finishing a law degree and passing the bar, however, Jala was a high school teacher in Quinoguitan in Loboc, and in Bohol School of Arts and Trade, now Central Visayas State College of Agriculture, Forestry and Technology (CVSCAFT), in Tagbilaran City. This stint as an educator was a potent input that consciously influence many of his decisions as a legislator. His concern for the youth is reflected on the bills he had authored or co- authored in Congress.

For a decade starting in 1982, he became a law practitioner and an active member of the Integrated Bar of the Philippines (IBP) Bohol Chapter . Eventually, he was chosen by his peers as a member of the board of Directors of the lawyers' group, and later, as its vice president. He continues to be a member of the Free Legal Assistance Group (FLAG), IBP, Brotherhood of Christian Businessmen and Professionals, Bohol island Lions International Club, aside from being a human rights lawyer.

He became a provincial lawmaker, winning a seat in the provincial board in 1992. For six years as a Provincial Kagawad, Jala sponsored some 180 resolutions and has authored some 50 ordinances, reflecting innate and selfless dedication to the job.

In 1998, he became representative in the third district of Bohol. Jala was chosen to chair the Committee on Civil Service and Professional Regulation, Senior Vice Chairman of the Higher and Technical Education committee, and a member of some 13 other House Committees.

Jala approved the filing of a measure that touches on the granting of civil service eligibility to government employees who have rendered continuous service for more than 10 years . He also filed a bill seeking to outlaw political turncoatism which has long made a mockery of our political system. Another bill be authored seeks to adopt community service as a human alternative penalty for certain offenses in lieu of imprisonment and fines.

Jala has been married to Remedios Limbago Jala for the past 24 years. They have two children, Adam Relson, a neophyte lawyer and succeeded him as representative in the Third District in 2007 elections and Majesty Eve.

References 

 http://www.boholchronicle.com/jun06/index6-11-06.htm
 http://www.manilatimes.net/national/2007/may/04/yehey/metro/20070504met3.html
 http://www.boholchronicle.com/jun06/11/front1.htm
 https://web.archive.org/web/20070716132250/http://www.manilatimes.net/national/2007/june/12/yehey/top_stories/20070612top6.html

Living people
1949 births
Lakas–CMD (1991) politicians
Members of the House of Representatives of the Philippines from Bohol
Members of the Bohol Provincial Board
People from Bohol
Filipino schoolteachers
20th-century Filipino educators